Émile Ripert (1882–1948) was a French academic, poet, novelist and playwright. He served as the inaugural Chair of Provençal Language and Literature at Aix-Marseille University. He was the author of three novels, four poetry collections, three plays and five non-fiction books about Provençal culture.

Early life
Émile Ripert was born on 19 November 1882 in La Ciotat near Marseille in Provence. His father was Joseph Casimir Ripert and his mother, Marie-Louise Beranger. His paternal grandfather came from Cadenet in Vaucluse.

Ripert graduated from the École Normale Supérieure. He completed a PhD from the University of Paris.

Career
Ripert began his career as a teacher in Toulon, followed by Marseille. He was appointed as the first-ever Chair of Provençal Language and Literature at Aix-Marseille University in Aix-en-Provence in 1920.

Meanwhile, Ripert published poetry collections as early as 1908. He published a travel narrative in 1925, and several plays from 1933 onward. He also published some novels.

Ripert was inducted into the Académie de Marseille in 1916, replacing Frédéric Mistral. At Mistral's funeral in 1914, Ripert had praised Giuseppe Bottai, a Fascist politician. Moreover, Ripert was part of an official delegation to Fascist Italy alongside Jean Rivain, Philippe de Zara, Rémy Roux and Marius Jouveau.

Personal life and death
Ripert married Adrienne Eugénie Gras on 25 April 1908. His father-in-law, Dr Evariste Gras, served as the mayor of La Ciotat.

Ripert died on 23 April 1948 in Marseille.

Works

Poetry

Novels

Plays

Non-fiction

References

1882 births
1948 deaths
People from Bouches-du-Rhône
École Normale Supérieure alumni
University of Paris alumni
Academic staff of Aix-Marseille University
French poets
French dramatists and playwrights
French novelists